Peter van Merksteijn Sr. (born 10 June 1956) is a Dutch racing driver and rally driver who drove for the Van Merksteijn Motorsport team in the 2011 World Rally Championship season with Citroën DS3 WRC.

Racing record

24 Hours of Le Mans results

WRC results

References

External links

1956 births
Living people
Dutch rally drivers
World Rally Championship drivers
Dutch racing drivers
24 Hours of Le Mans drivers
European Le Mans Series drivers
American Le Mans Series drivers
Sportspeople from Hengelo
24 Hours of Spa drivers